The 2022 United States House of Representatives elections in Oklahoma were held on November 8, 2022, to elect the five U.S. representatives from the state of Oklahoma, one from each of the state's five congressional districts. The primary elections for the Republican. Democratic, and Libertarian parties' nominations took place on June 28, 2022.

The 2022 election cycle was the first election following redistricting in 2020–21. Redistricting in Oklahoma was postponed to a special legislative session, because of the 2020 United States census data's release being delayed. New congressional districts were signed into law based on data from the 2020 United States census on November 22, 2021.

District 1

The incumbent is Republican Kevin Hern, was re-elected with 63.7% of the vote in 2020. Since only one candidate filed to be a nominee for each party, there will be no primary elections in Oklahoma's first congressional district.

General election

Candidates
Adam Martin, Oklahoma State University graduate (Democratic)
Kevin Hern, incumbent first elected in 2018 (Republican)
Evelyn Rogers, perennial candidate (Independent)

Withdrew before filing
John Patrick Swoboda, teacher (Democratic)

Endorsements

Predictions

Results

District 2

The incumbent is Republican Markwayne Mullin, who was re-elected with 75% of the vote in 2020. On February 26, 2022, Mullin announced his retirement and intention to run for U.S. Senate. Since only one candidate filed for the Democratic Party's nomination there is no Democratic primary.

Republican primary
The 14 candidate Republican primary for Oklahoma's 2nd Congressional district is the largest Republican primary since 1936 when 15 Republican candidate ran for Oklahoma Corporate Commissioner and the largest primary in the state since the 24-candidate 1954 Democratic primary for Oklahoma Secretary of State.

Oklahoma's 2nd congressional district has been noted for drawing several tribal citizens to the race. After the McGirt v. Oklahoma decision there has been renewed interest in issues related to tribal sovereignty. Guy Barker is the secretary-treasurer of the Quapaw Nation and Wes Nofire is a Cherokee Nation tribal councilor. In addition, Josh Brecheen, Avery Frix and Dustin Roberts are members of the Choctaw Nation and Johnny Teehee is a member of the Cherokee Nation.

At least one candidate, John R. Bennett, has called for the disestablishment of the Muscogee Nation in Oklahoma. The Inter-Tribal Council of the Five Tribes denounced Bennett's candidacy in response to his calls for disestablishment.

Nominee
Josh Brecheen, Choctaw citizen, former State Senator for the 6th district (2010–2018)

Eliminated in runoff

 Avery Frix, Choctaw citizen, State Representative for the 13th district (2017–present) and employee at Frix Construction

Eliminated in primary
Guy Barker, secretary-treasurer of the Quapaw Nation
John Bennett, former chair of the Oklahoma Republican Party (2021–2022), former State Representative for the 2nd district (2011–2019), and U.S. Marine Corps veteran
David Derby, former State Representative for the 74th district (2006–2016), pharmacist, and former forensic chemist for Tulsa Police Department
Pamela Gordon, grant analyst for the Choctaw Nation and former crime scene investigator liaison with the McAlester Army Ammunition Plant
Rhonda Hopkins, nurse, candidate for Oklahoma's 2nd congressional district in 2020, and candidate for the state house in the 86th district in 2016 and 2018.
Clint Johnson, rancher, U.S. Marine Corps veteran, and former Cherokee County Sheriff's deputy
Wes Nofire, member of the Cherokee Nation tribal council and former professional boxer under the name "The Cherokee Warrior"
Marty Quinn, State Senator for the 2nd district (2014–present)
Dustin Roberts, State Representative for the 21st district (2010–present), deputy floor leader for the Oklahoma House of Representatives, and U.S. Navy veteran
Chris Schiller, pharmaceutical executive and former president of the Oklahoma Pharmacists Association
Johnny Teehee, Muskogee Chief of Police
Erick Wyatt, U.S. Coast Guard and U.S. Army veteran

Declined
Charles McCall, Speaker of the Oklahoma House of Representatives (running for reelection)
Markwayne Mullin, incumbent (running for U.S. Senate)
Josh West, State Representative for the 5th district (running for reelection)

Endorsements

Primary endorsements

Runoff endorsements

Debate

Polling

Runoff polling

Results

Primary results

Runoff results

General election

Candidate
Josh Brecheen, former State Senator for the 6th district (2010–2018) (Republican)
Naomi Andrews,  CD-1 vice-chairwoman for the state Democratic Party, director of marketing and development for the Kingsley-Kleimann Group, and executive director for the Center for Plain Language (Democratic)
"Bulldog" Ben Robinson, former Democratic state senator for the 9th district (1989–2004) (Independent)

Endorsements

Predictions

Results

District 3

The 3rd district encompasses Northwestern Oklahoma, taking in the Oklahoma Panhandle, and all or part of 32 different counties, including parts of Canadian County and Oklahoma City. The incumbent is Republican Frank Lucas, who was re-elected with 78.5% of the vote in 2020. Since only one candidate filed for the Democratic Party's nomination there is no Democratic primary.

Republican primary

Candidates

Nominee
Frank Lucas, incumbent

Eliminated in primary
Wade Burleson, writer, two-term President of the Baptist General Convention of Oklahoma, former chaplain of the Tulsa Police Department, and retired pastor of Emmanuel Enid
Stephen Butler, owner of Clearview Window Cleaning

Withdrew
Sean Roberts, State Representative for the 36th district (2011–2022) (running for Commissioner of Labor)

Endorsements

Results

General election

Candidate
Frank Lucas, incumbent (Republican)
Jeremiah Ross, attorney, former assistant attorney general for the Osage Nation, former candidate for Oklahoma House District 29 (Democratic)

Predictions

Results

District 4

The incumbent is Republican Tom Cole, who was re-elected with 67.8% of the vote in 2020. Since only one candidate filed for the Democratic Party's nomination there is no Democratic primary.

Republican primary

Candidates

Nominee
Tom Cole, incumbent

Eliminated in primary
James Taylor, former Oklahoma City Public Schools teacher, senior pastor of Christ's Church Norman, Oklahoma, and Republican primary candidate for Oklahoma's 4th congressional district in 2016, 2018, and 2020
Frank Blacke

Endorsements

Results

General election
Tom Cole, incumbent (Republican)
Mary Brannon, former teacher and  nominee for Oklahoma's 4th congressional district in 2018 and 2020 (Democratic)

Candidate

Predictions

Results

District 5

The incumbent is Republican Stephanie Bice, who flipped the district and was elected with 52.1% of the vote in 2020. Since only one candidate filed for the Democratic Party's nomination there is no Democratic primary.

Republican primary

Nominee
Stephanie Bice, incumbent

Eliminated in primary
Subrina Banks, real estate agent and YouTuber

Endorsements

Results

General election

Candidates
Stephanie Bice, incumbent (Republican)
David K. Frosch (Independent)
Joshua Harris-Till, former president of Young Democrats of America (2019-2021), candidate for Oklahoma's 2nd congressional district in 2014 and 2016, and cousin of Emmett Till (Democratic)

Withdrew before filing
Abby Broyles, journalist, attorney, and nominee for U.S. Senate in 2020 (Democratic)
Jimmy Lawson, Director of Permitting at the Oklahoma Workers' Compensation Commission, finance professor at Rose State College, and candidate for Oklahoma City Mayor in 2022 (Democratic)

Endorsements

Predictions

Results

See also 
 2022 Oklahoma elections

Notes

References

External links 
Official campaign websites for 1st district candidates
Kevin Hern (R) for Congress
Adam Martin (D) for Congress

Official campaign websites for 2nd district candidates
Naomi Andrews (D) for Congress
Josh Brecheen (R) for Congress
Avery Frix (R) for Congress

Official campaign websites for 3rd district candidates
Frank Lucas (R) for Congress

Official campaign websites for 4th district candidates
Mary Brannon (D) for Congress
Tom Cole (R) for Congress

Official campaign websites for 5th district candidates
Stephanie Bice (R) for Congress
Joshua Harris-Till (D) for Congress

2022
Oklahoma
United States House of Representatives